The 2013 season is the 92nd season in El Salvador's history, their 75th in FIFA and 51st in CONCACAF. As of December 2012, the team was managed by Agustín Castillo.

Most of January 2013 was spent playing in the 2013 Copa Centroamericana. El Salvador reached the semi-finals, lost, and took part in the third-place finals. They finished in third place but were able to qualify for the 2013 CONCACAF Gold Cup.

Players
The following players have been capped during the 2012 season (listed alphabetically):
name (games played)

 Jonathan Águila (1)
 Jaime Alas (1)
 Léster Blanco (5)
 Darwin Bonilla (4)
 Nelson Bonilla (4)
 Rafael Burgos (5)
 Cristian Castillo (5)
 Derby Carrillo (2w
 Darwin Ceren (6)

 Dustin Corea (1)
 Andrés Flores (4)
 Xavier García (6)
 José Granadino (6)
 Isidro Gutiérrez (4)
 José Henríquez (6)
 Alexander Larín (3)
 Gustavo López (1)
 Gerson Mayen (3)

 Richard Menjivar (6)
 Milton Molina (1)
 Carlos Monteagudo (4)
 Dagoberto Portillo (4)
 Nestor Renderos (1)
 Osael Romero (2)
 Herbert Sosa (4)
 Ricardo Ulloa (1)

Debutants
 José Miguel Granadino – on January 18 started on Copa Centroamericana match against Honduras
 Richard Menjivar – on January 18 started on Copa Centroamericana match against Honduras
 Gerson Mayen – on January 18 came on as a substitute on Copa Centroamericana match against Honduras
 Darwin Bonilla – on January 25 came on as a substitute on Copa Centroamericana match against Costa Rica
 Derby Carrillo – on January 28 started on Copa Centroamericana match against Belize
 Dustin Corea – on March 21 started on a friendly match against Ecuador
 Gustavo López – on March 21 came on as a substitute on a friendly match against Ecuador
 Nestor Renderos – on March 21 came on as a substitute on a friendly match against Ecuador.

Player statistics

Goal scorers

Goal assists

Bookings

Competitions

Overall

Results summary

Friendly

2013 Copa Centroamericana

El Salvador and Panama finished with identical records and so their positions were determined by drawing of lots. El Salvador won and was placed second.

Group B

Quarter-finals

Coaching staff

Ranking

References

2013
El
2013–14 in Salvadoran football
2012–13 in Salvadoran football